Duel is a 2004 Iranian war drama film It was directed by Ahmad Reza Darvish, who was mostly known for films about the Iran–Iraq War. Duel was shot in roughly 11 months in various cities of Iran. The first screening was at the Fajr International Film Festival, in 2004, where it won 8 Crystal Simorgh Award. Also, it is the first Iranian Movie to use Dolby Digital Sound. It is one of the most expensive independent movies ever made in Iranian cinema history.

Plot
Zeinal, an Iranian soldier who has been a prisoner of war for more than 20 years, returns only to see that he has been deemed a traitor. The story revolves around Zeinal and Eskanadar who both are looking for a chest containing several important documents.

Cast
 Pejman Bazeghi as Zeinal
 Saeed Rad as Eskandar
 Parivash Nazarieh as Salimeh
 Parviz Parastui as Yusef
 Hedieh Tehrani as Haniyeh
 Kambiz Dirbaz as Yahya
 Anoushirvan Arjmand as Latif
 Vahid Rahbani as Ismaeel
 Mehdi Saki as Assad
 Abolfazl Shah Karam as Mansour
 Ali Mardaneh as Ghasem
 Nasrin Seaghat
 Hossein Saharkhiz
 Mohammad Ranjbar
 Rahman Bagherian
 Tooraj Faramarzian
 Shirin Dejagah
 Abdolhossein Tosheh
 Hossein Afshar
 Mohammad Afravi
 Arash Sarban
 Sudabeh Alipour
 Ahmad Sarafraz
 Hossein Majdzadeh
 Abbas Asakereh

Reception
 Variety: An invigorating men-in-war movie, with an almost "Three Kings"-like flavor, Iranian action-drama "The Duel" will come as a pleasant surprise to auds sated by either peasant dramas or arty, metaphorical fare from the region. Punchily directed by Ahmad Reza Darvish, with a real sense of the smoke, noise and chaos of battle, this smart, well-played drama deserves wider recognition through the festival circuit as an example of quality commercial cinema from Iran. Ethnic-centered webs should also take note.

Award
 Won Crystal Simorgh for Best Director Ahmad Reza Darvish – Fajr International Film Festival 2004
 Won Crystal Simorgh for Best Cinematography Bahram Badakshani – Fajr International Film Festival 2004
 Won Crystal Simorgh for Best Editor Mostafa Kherghehpoush – Fajr International Film Festival 2004
 Won Crystal Simorgh for Best Set & Costume Design Amir Esbati – Fajr International Film Festival 2004
 Won Crystal Simorgh for Best Sound Mix Hamid Naghibi – Fajr International Film Festival 2004
 Won Crystal Simorgh for Best Sound Mix Masoud Behnam – Fajr International Film Festival 2004
 Won Crystal Simorgh for Best Special Effects Mohsen Rouzbahani – Fajr International Film Festival 2004
 Won Crystal Simorgh for Best Sound Mix Frédéric Le Louet – Fajr International Film Festival 2004
 Won Crystal Simorgh Kambiz Dirbaz for Best Supporting Actor – Fajr International Film Festival 2004
 Won Special Award for Best Director Ahmad Reza Darvish – Moghavemat International Film Festival 2004
 Won Five Award for Best Sound Mix, Best Edit, Best Special Effects and Best Costume Design in House of Cinema 2004
 Won Special Jury Award for Best Director Ahmad Reza Darvish – Busan International Film Festival 2004

Music
Music duel movie made by Majid Entezami, is That Including 20 Track. Have a different Entezami Album vestigial with Kamancheh, Bagpipes, Horn, Trombone, Ney and Trumpet in Choir.

Track listing

References

External links
 
 All In One Boat
 The New York Times
 The Independent Critic
 Film | Variety
 All Top Action Movies

2004 films
Iran–Iraq War films
2000s war drama films
2000s Persian-language films
Iranian war drama films
Films whose director won the Best Directing Crystal Simorgh
2004 drama films